The 2021 Georgetown Hoyas football team represented Georgetown University as a member of the Patriot League during the 2021 NCAA Division I FCS football season. The Hoyas, led by seventh-year head coach Rob Sgarlata, played their home games at Cooper Field.

Schedule

References

Georgetown
Georgetown Hoyas football seasons
Georgetown Hoyas football